The 2021–22 Alabama Crimson Tide men's basketball team represented the University of Alabama in the 2021–22 NCAA Division I men's basketball season. The team is led by third-year head coach Nate Oats. They played their home games at Coleman Coliseum in Tuscaloosa, Alabama as a member of the Southeastern Conference. They finished the season 19–14, 9–9 in SEC Play to finish a five-way tie for 5th place. They lost in the Second Round of the SEC tournament to Vanderbilt. They received an at-large bid to the NCAA tournament as the No. 6 seed in the West Region, where they were upset in the First Round by Notre Dame.

Previous season
The Crimson Tide finished the 2019–20 season 26–7, 16–2 in SEC play to win the regular season Southeastern Conference Championship, marking the team’s first championship since 2002. They also won the SEC tournament, their first win in that competition since 1991 and the first time since 1987 that the program won both the regular season and tournament.

The Tide were placed as a No. 2 seed in the East Region for the 2021 NCAA tournament, their highest placement since 2002. They would defeat Iona and Maryland before falling to a surging 11-seed UCLA in the Sweet Sixteen in overtime, 88–78 (that UCLA team made the Final Four). Alabama was ranked No. 5 in the final Coaches' Poll following the season, and Oats was named SEC Coach of the Year as well as being a finalist for National Coach of the Year honors.

Offseason

Departures

Incoming transfers

2021 recruiting class

2022 Recruiting class

Roster

Schedule and results

|-
!colspan=12 style=|Exhibition

|-
!colspan=12 style=|regular season

|-
!colspan=12 style=|  SEC Tournament

|-
!colspan=12 style=|NCAA tournament

Rankings

*AP does not release post-NCAA Tournament rankings
^Coaches did not release a Week 1 poll.

See also
2021–22 Alabama Crimson Tide women's basketball team

References    

Alabama
Alabama Crimson Tide men's basketball seasons
Alabama Crimson Tide
Alabama Crimson Tide
Alabama